Belgrave was an artistic pop band from Montreal, Quebec, Canada. The band consists of Trevor Boucher on vocals, his brother Liam Boucher on keyboards, their cousin Catherine Cere on violin, Michael Bufo on guitar, and Jonathan Powter on drums.

History
The band was formed in September 2009 under the name Coral Red. In March of that year, the Sam Roberts Band and Coral Red performed at a private event together. During their performance, the band drew the attention of producer Joseph Donovan who invited them to support his band Receivers in May of that same year. The reviews were positive and Donovan arranged to produce the band that summer. Following their performance with Scotland's We Were Promised Jetpacks, the band changed their name to Belgrave on August 26, 2010. After six months in studio Belgrave emerged with a six-song self-titled EP in May 2011.  The EP drew the attention of New York's Paper Garden Records earning them a spot in their Lovely Hearts Club and an invitation to New York's CMJ Music Marathon.

Influence
Three of the band members (Trevor Boucher, Liam Boucher, and Catherine Cere) are first cousins of Montreal French Horn player Pietro Amato, who was well-known in the Montreal music scene. His music had a strong influence on Belgrave's EP.

Discography
Belgrave (2011 self-titled EP)

Videos
Six Minutes music video is from their debut EP Belgrave and was recorded at the same location where they performed with Sam Roberts Band at the 'Eric Maclean Centre for the Performing Arts'.

Notable Appearances
Radio play and interviews on Montreal's CHOM-FM.
Performed alongside Sam Roberts Band in March 2010.
Multiple performances at both Pop Montreal Festival and Toronto's Canadian Music Week.
Showcased at New Yorks's CMJ Music Marathon in 2011.

Belgrave released no music other than their 2011 EP. The last post on the band's Facebook page was in December 2016.

References

See also

Belgrave on YouTube

Musical groups established in 2009
Musical groups from Montreal
Canadian pop music groups
2009 establishments in Quebec